Handsworth F.C. was an English football club based in Handsworth, Sheffield, South Yorkshire. They last played in the Sheffield & Hallamshire County Senior League, before merging with Parramore Sports F.C. in 2014 to form Handsworth Parramore F.C.

History
The club was established in 2003, entering the Sheffield & Hallamshire County Senior League. In 2004–05 they finished third in Division Two, and were promoted to Division One. In 2007–08 they won Division One, and were promoted to the Premier Division. In 2009–10 they finished third in the Premier Division, and were promoted to Division One of the Northern Counties East Football League, winning the league in the 2011–12 season. However, Handworth were not able to be promoted to the Premier Division due to ground grading issues and instead had to move back down to the County Senior League.

In the summer of 2014, just weeks after winning the County Senior League Premier Division title for the first time, the club merged with Worksop Parramore to form Handsworth Parramore F.C. Five years later, the merged club dropped the Parramore suffix to become Handsworth FC.

League and cup history

Honours

League
Northern Counties East Football League Division One
Champions: 2011–12
Sheffield & Hallamshire County Senior League Premier Division
Champions: 2013–14
Promoted: 2009–10
Sheffield & Hallamshire County Senior League Division One
Promoted: 2007–08 (champions)
Sheffield & Hallamshire County Senior League Division Two
Promoted: 2004–05

Cup
Northern Counties East Football League Presidents Cup
Winners: 2011–12

Records
Best League performance: 1st, Northern Counties East Football League Division One, 2011–12
Record attendance: 297 vs. Hallam, Northern Counties East Football League Division One, 2011–12

References

Defunct football clubs in England
Association football clubs established in 2003
Sport in Sheffield
2003 establishments in England
Association football clubs disestablished in 2013
2013 disestablishments in England
Defunct football clubs in South Yorkshire
Northern Counties East Football League
Sheffield & Hallamshire County Senior Football League